Tikankaivanto Canal is a canal between Pyhäselkä and Tikanselkä in Liperi, Finland.

References

Canals in Finland
Liperi